Francesco Arancio (born 1844) was an Italian painter.

He was born in Palermo, where he first trained under Salvatore Lo Forte. In 1870, he won a bronze medal at the Exposition of Palermo for his painting of a large realistic portrait of a Garibaldino and similarly a bronze medal from Messina for a small canvas representing the choir of the Cathedral of Palermo; and an honorable mention at the Casino delle Arti in Palermo for a small canvas depicting a half-figure. He also completed many portraits of prominent families of Palermo. Among his works are: 
Interior of the Church of the Martorana.
Madonna dell'Arco for the church of San Francesco da Paola in Palermo
Madonna del Perpetuo Soccorso on gilded wood, for the church of Santi Pietro e Paolo in Palermo
Sant'Antonio for the church of Sepolcro in Bagheria, near Palermo
Choir of the Cathedral of Palermo
La Pesca
Studio dal vero

References

1844 births
Painters from Palermo
19th-century Italian painters
Italian male painters
Year of death missing
19th-century Italian male artists